Japonolirion is a genus of plants in the family Petrosaviaceae. There is only one known species, Japonolirion osense, endemic to Japan. It is found in grasslands, wetlands and alpine meadows.

Description 
Japonolirion osense is a herbaceous, perennial plant with subterranean creeping rootstocks. The leaf base encloses the younger leaves. The flower stalks emerge from shoots that carried leaves during the previous year, so it stands separately from the current leaf rosette. There are 6 stamens of about 1.5 mm long, each carrying a yellow anther. At the heart of the flower are three free green carpels that later develop into oval capsules of about 2.5 mm high. Flowering occurs in July and August.

References 

Petrosaviales
Monotypic monocot genera
Endemic flora of Japan